Bridgeport is a city in Jackson County, Alabama, United States. At the time of 2020 census the population was 2,264, down from 2,418 in 2010. Bridgeport is included in the Chattanooga-Cleveland-Dalton, TN-GA-AL Combined Statistical Area.

History

Bridgeport developed after the 1840s, when European Americans established a riverboat landing here along the Tennessee River.  This landing was a place for local farmers to trade their crops for other goods.  Within a few years, a small hamlet known as "Jonesville" had developed around the landing, and included a trading post, gristmill, warehouses, and several saloons. The Jonesville post office opened in 1852.

Fluctuating river levels made riverboat trade unreliable, and area merchants began campaigning for railroad access in the late 1840s.  The first rail line reached Jonesville in 1852.  A railroad bridge over the Tennessee River was completed in 1854, connecting the city with Chattanooga, Tennessee. In recognition of this accomplishment, the name of the city was changed to "Bridgeport."  Construction of a second rail line connecting Bridgeport with Jasper, Tennessee, to the north, began in 1860, but was not completed until after the Civil War.

Because of its location on both a rail line and the Tennessee River, Bridgeport was a strategic site during the Civil War. The rail bridge at Bridgeport was among those targeted by the East Tennessee bridge-burning conspiracy in November 1861. Although this attempt failed, the bridge would be burned twice during the course of the war.

Bridgeport was the site of numerous skirmishes across 1862 and 1863 when Union General Ormsby Mitchel seized control of the city, and numerous other small actions over the following year as Confederate forces attempted to regain control of the area. The city was burned by Confederate troops under General Braxton Bragg in the Summer of 1863, but it was reoccupied by Union forces. In the latter part of the war, Bridgeport was the site of a major Union shipyard that built gunboats and transports for the Union Army. The USS Chattanooga was built here; it became a vital part of the famous "Cracker Line," which broke the Confederates' siege of Chattanooga in November 1863.

In the early 1880s, brothers Frank and Walter Kilpatrick, investors from New York, along with their father, Edward, established a lumber company in Bridgeport.  Believing the city's location and resources had extraordinary potential for development, the Kilpatricks began buying up land in the area.  Other investors became interested in the city, and in 1889 the Bridgeport Land and Development Company was incorporated.  This company bought up land and laid out a new grid pattern for the city, which incorporated in 1891.

Frank Kilpatrick, who became the city's mayor, built a series of imposing Queen Anne-style houses on the street now known as Kilpatrick Row.  Several factories, including a pipe works, stove works, rail car works, and planing mill, were built along the river.  The rapid development of Bridgeport came to an abrupt end, however, with the onset of the financial Panic of 1893.  Investors withdrew from the area, and the Bridgeport Land and Improvement Company went out of business.

Frank Kilpatrick returned to Bridgeport in 1895, and managed to lure some industry to the city.  The Mission Revival-style Bridgeport Depot was completed in 1917, and two hosiery mills were operating in the city by the 1920s.  The construction of the nearby Widows Creek Power Plant by the Tennessee Valley Authority in the 1950s brought a small housing boom to the city.

Geography
The city is situated along the western bank of the Tennessee River, at river mile 410. This section of the river is part of Guntersville Lake, which is created by Guntersville Dam about 60 miles downstream from Bridgeport. The Cumberland Plateau rises prominently to the northwest, and the plateau's southern extension, Sand Mountain, rises across the river to the east. U.S. Route 72 connects Bridgeport with South Pittsburg across the Tennessee state line to the north, and Stevenson to the southwest.

Demographics

2000 census
At the 2000 census there were 2,728 people in 1,159 households, including 793 families, in the city. The racial makeup of the city was 87.76% White, 8.03% Black or African American, 1.43% Native American, 0.11% Asian, 0.37% from other races, and 2.31% from two or more races. 1.32% of the population were Hispanic or Latino of any race.

Of the 1,159 households 29.7% had children under the age of 18 living with them, 49.7% were married couples living together, 13.9% had a female householder with no husband present, and 31.5% were non-families. 29.5% of households were one person and 13.1% were one person aged 65 or older. The average household size was 2.35 and the average family size was 2.88.

The age distribution was 24.0% under the age of 18, 8.4% from 18 to 24, 27.1% from 25 to 44, 24.9% from 45 to 64, and 15.5% 65 or older. The median age was 38 years. For every 100 females, there were 90.2 males. For every 100 females age 18 and over, there were 86.3 males.

The median household income was $28,981 and the median family income  was $33,712. Males had a median income of $30,685 versus $19,583 for females. The per capita income for the city was $15,779. About 9.5% of families and 13.4% of the population were below the poverty line, including 17.4% of those under age 18 and 23.8% of those age 65 or over.

2010 census
At the 2010 census there were 2,418 people in 1,012 households, including 686 families, in the city. The racial makeup of the city was 84.0% White, 8.6% Black or African American, 1.9% Native American, 0.2% Asian, 1.2% from other races, and 4.1% from two or more races. 1.7% of the population were Hispanic or Latino of any race.
Of the 1,012 households 26.4% had children under the age of 18 living with them, 45.0% were married couples living together, 15.3% had a female householder with no husband present, and 32.2% were non-families. 27.9% of households were one person and 13.1% were one person aged 65 or older. The average household size was 2.39 and the average family size was 2.89.

The age distribution was 23.9% under the age of 18, 7.8% from 18 to 24, 23.1% from 25 to 44, 28.9% from 45 to 64, and 16.4% 65 or older. The median age was 40.5 years. For every 100 females, there were 95.9 males. For every 100 females age 18 and over, there were 95.3 males.

The median household income was $36,282 and the median family income  was $43,239. Males had a median income of $44,188 versus $28,944 for females. The per capita income for the city was $19,048. About 14.0% of families and 16.0% of the population were below the poverty line, including 32.1% of those under age 18 and 4.6% of those age 65 or over.

2020 census

As of the 2020 United States census, there were 2,264 people, 1,031 households, and 586 families residing in the city.

Climate
The climate in this area is characterized by hot, humid summers and generally mild to cool winters.  According to the Köppen Climate Classification system, Bridgeport has a humid subtropical climate, abbreviated "Cfa" on climate maps.

References

External links

Bridgeport, Alabama history

Military reports of the 1862 skirmish
Siege at Bridgeport re-enactment site

1852 establishments in Alabama
Alabama populated places on the Tennessee River
Cities in Alabama
Cities in Jackson County, Alabama
Historic American Engineering Record in Alabama
Populated places established in 1852